Mario Rosemblatt is a Chilean immunologist. His research established that dendritic cells are responsible for imprinting the tissue-specific homing of T lymphocytes. He is currently Executive Director of Fundacion Ciencia para la Vida (FCV), a non profit institution that carries out scientific and technological research. He is Immunology Professor at the University of Chile and Universidad Nacional Andres Bello (Santiago, Chile) and Adjunct Professor at Dartmouth Medical School.

Biography
Mario Rosemblatt earned his Ph.D. degree in immunology at Wayne State University. He has been Research Fellow in Medicine at Harvard University (1973) joining the group of Dr. Edgar Haber, Assistant Professor at Brown University (1976), Investigator at the Boston Biomedical Research Institute (1978) and the Association Against Cancer in France (1981).  In 1983, he returned to Chile and joined the Faculty of Sciences at the University of Chile. He was Chairman of the Biology Department and Director of the team that established the degree in Biotechnology at the University of Chile, acting as the first Director of this program. In 1997 he joined the Fundación Ciencia para la Vida acting as its first Executive Director.

Research
During his years at the Boston Biomedical Research Institute Dr. Rosemblatt was the first to publish a report on the use of monoclonal antibody technology to study muscle physiology. The main aspects of his research deals with studies related to the function of regulatory T cells. His team has demonstrated that although B cells and dendritic cells can generate regulatory T cells by themselves, a mixture of both antigen-presenting cells improves their capacity to efficiently generate regulatory T cells. He also has established that gut dendritic cells are responsible for the production of retinoic acid and therefore for the induction of a tolerogenic environment in the gut. As an immunologist he participated in the development of a salmon vaccine –presently in the market, licensed to Novartis- against the Pitsireckettsia salmonis a deadly pathogen that affects the salmon industry in Chile. 
Mario Rosemblatt is a member of the American Association of Immunologists, of the Transplantation Society, of the Chilean Society for Cell Biology and the Chilean Society of Immunology.

Publications

Selection of Papers
 Jørgensen TN, Alfaro J, Enriquez HL, Jiang C, Loo WM, Atencio S, Bupp MR, Mailloux CM, Metzger T, Flannery S, Rozzo SJ, Kotzin BL, Rosemblatt M., Bono MR, Erickson LD. Development of murine lupus involves the combined genetic contribution of the SLAM and FcgammaR intervals within the Nba2 autoimmune susceptibility locus. J Immunol. 15; 775-86, 2010
 C. Moore, D. Sauma, P. Reyes, J. Morales, M. Rosemblatt, M.R. Bono and J.A. Fierro. Dendritic Cells and B Cells Cooperate in the Generation of CD4+CD25+Foxp3+ Allogeneic T Cells. Transplant. Proc. 42; 371-5, 2010
 Elgueta R., Sepulveda F., E. Vilches F., Vargas L., Mora J.R., Bono M.R., Rosemblatt M. Imprinting of CCR9 on CD4 T cells requires IL-4 signalling on mesenteric lymph node dendritic cells. J. Immunol. 180; 6501-7, 2008
 Gabrielle Faure-André, Pablo Vargas, Maria-Isabel Yuseff, Mélina Heuzé, Jheimmy Diaz, Danielle Lankar, Veronica Steri, Jeremy Manry, Stéphanie Hugues, Fulvia Vascotto, Jérôme Boulanger, Graça Raposo, Maria-Rosa Bono, Mario Rosemblatt, Matthieu Piel and Ana-Maria Lennon-Duménil. CD74, the MHC class II-associated Invariant Chain, regulates the motility and in vivo migration of dendritic cells. Science 322; 1705–1710, 2008
 Bono MR, Elgueta R, Sauma D, Pino K, Osorio F, Michea, P, Fierro A, Rosemblatt M. The essential role of chemokines in the selective regulation of lymphocyte homing. Cytokine and Growth Factor Reviews. 18: (1-2): 33-43, 2007
 Micah J. Benson, Karina Pino-Lagos, Mario Rosemblatt and Randolph J. Noelle. All-trans retinoic acid mediates enhanced Treg growth, differentiation and gut homing in the face of high levels of co-stimulation. J. Exp. Med. 204: 1765-74, 2007
 M. Rosemblatt and M.R. Bono. “Functional consequences of immune cell adhesion to endothelial cells”. Current Pharmaceutical Design, 10: 109-120, 2004
 J.R. Mora, M.R. Bono, N. Manjunath, W. Weninger, M. Rosemblatt, U.H. Von Andrian. "Peyer's patch dendritic cells provide tissue-specific instructions for effector T cell homing to the gut". Nature 424:88-93, 2003
 L. I. Reyes, P. Escobar, M. R. Bono and M. Rosemblatt. “B lymphocyte adhesion to endothelial cells from human lymphoid tissue modulates tyrosine phosphorylation and endothelial cell activation”. J. Immunol. 169: 5881-5888, 2002
 Ana-Maria Lennon-Duménil, Arnold H. Bakker, René Maehr, Herman S. Overkleeft, Mario Rosemblatt, Hidde L. Ploegh and Cécile Lagaudrière-Gesbert. "Analysis of protease in live antigen-presenting cells show regulation of the phagosomal proteolytic contents during dendritic cell activation ". J. Exp. Med. 169: 529-539, 2002
 Rosemblatt M., Gaugler M.H., Leroy C., Coulombel L. Coexpression of two fibronectin receptors, VLA-4 and VLA-5 on immature erythroblastic precursor cells. J. Clinic. Invest. 87: 6, 1991.
 Rosemblatt M., Hidalgo C., Vergara C., Ikemoto N. Immunological and biochemical properties of transverse tubule membranes from rabbit skeletal muscle. J. Biol. Chem. 256: 8140, 1981
 Rosemblatt M., Haber E. Isolation of a variable domain fragment from a homogeneous antibody heavy chain. Biochem. 17: 3877, 1978

Books and Book Chapters
 WILHELM V., ENGEL, E., MIQUEL A., JAMETT A., AGUAYO J., MÜLLER I., MORALES C., HERNÁNDEZ C., SOZA C., SOZA J., VILLEGAS J., BERNALES S., MARTÍNEZ R., ROSEMBLATT M., BURZIO L.O. y VALENZUELA P.D.T. Piscirickettsia salmonis: Un enfoque genómico para un problema de la salmonicultura. Biotecnología Marina, Paniagua, J. (ed.). Editorial AGT S.A., México, p. 188- 220. 2005
 PALOMO, A. FERREIRA, C. SEPULVEDA, M. ROSEMBLATT, U. VERGARA. Editores. Fundamentos de Inmunología. Ed. Universidad de Talca, Talca, Chile. Segunda Edición. 2002
 R. MORA and M. ROSEMBLATT. Receptores de Adhesión, “Homing” y Activación de Linfocitos. Capítulo 12. Eds. I. Palomo, A. Ferreira, C. Sepúlveda, M. Rosemblatt y U. Vergara. Ed. Universidad de Talca, Talca, Chile. 2002
 R. NAVES and M. ROSEMBLATT. Ontogenia y Diferenciación de Células T y B. Capítulo 13. Eds. I. Palomo, A. Ferreira, C. Sepúlveda, M. Rosemblatt y U. Vergara. Ed. Universidad de Talca, Talca, Chile. 2002
 M. ROSEMBLATT. Nuevas alianzas en la comunidad Biotecnológica Chilena. En: Organismos Genéticamente Modificados. Producción, Comercialización, Bioseguridad y Percepción Pública. Eds. Dr. Lionel Gil y Bq. Carlos Irarrázabal. pp 183–188.  2000
 PALOMO, A. FERREIRA, C. SEPÚLVEDA, M. ROSEMBLATT, U. VERGARA. Editores. Fundamentos de Inmunología. Ed. Universidad de Talca, Talca, Chile, 1998
 M. ROSEMBLATT. Moléculas de Adhesión. Capítulo 11. En: Fundamentos de Inmunología. Eds. I. Palomo, A. Ferreira, C. Sepúlveda, M. Rosemblatt y U. Vergara. Ed. Univ. de Talca. Talca. pp 251–270. 1998
 M. ROSEMBLATT. Diferenciación Linfocitaria. Capítulo 12. En: Fundamentos de Inmunología. Eds. I. Palomo, A. Ferreira, C. Sepúlveda, M. Rosemblatt y U. Vergara. Ed. Univ. de Talca. Talca. pp 2271–286. 1998
 COULOMBEL  L, VUILLET-GAUGLER MH, KEIFFERN N, ROSEMBLATT M., Vainchenker W, Breton-Gorius J. Adhesion of erythroid cells to fibronectin and identification of receptors for extracellular matrix proteins. In The hematopoietic microenvironment. M Long and M Whicha eds. Johns Hopkins. University Press USA. p. 190-205.1993
 ROSEMBLATT M., PÉREZ G, ANTONIU B, REILLEY E, IKEMOTO N: Monoclonal antibodies as probes of triad structure and excitation contraction coupling in skeletal muscle. In: Signal Transduction in Biological System. S. C. Hidalgo et al. eds. Plenum Press, New York USA. p. 371. 1990
 ROSEMBLATT M. Hibridomas y Anticuerpos Monoclonales. In: La revolución de la Bioingeniería. F  Monckeberg Ed.  Mediterráneo-Chile. p. 78. 1988
 IKEMOTO N., MESZAROS M., MORIL M., KIM D.H., ROSEMBLATT M. Molecular mechanism of calcium release from sarcoplasmic reticulum in vitro. Current status and prospects. In: Perspectives in Biological Energy Transduction. Academic Press. Tokyo. p. 207. 1987
 BURTON J., ROSEMBLATT M., HABER E. Approaches to the synthesis of an antibody combining site.  In: Antibodies in human diagnostic and therapy. Raven Press. New York. p. 205. 1977
 HABER E., MARGOLIES M.N., CANNON L.E, ROSEMBLATT M. Restricted clonal responses: A tool in understanding antibody specificity. In: Molecular approaches to immunology. Academic Press. New York. p. 303. 1975

External links
 Fundacion Ciencia Para la Vida

References

1941 births
Living people
Chilean immunologists